Yasemin Aygün Savgı (born 4 March 1982), better known as Yasemin Mori, is a Turkish alternative rock singer.

Biography
As daughter of military architect father and Edirne-born mother worked as a sales chief on Turkish Airlines, her original last name was Savgı. She chooses to go by the scene alias mori, which means girl in various ethnic Balkan Turkic dialects, and which was a name she was called by many of her friends as a young girl.

She composed her first song when she was a teenager with contributions of her elder sister's music record share. At a Kings of Convenience concert on Istanbul on July 6, 2005, she invaded the stage by dancing on her own. Her first album Hayvanlar was released on 10 July 2008 by Irmak Plak. Mori released her second studio album Deli Bando in October 2012 after three years of development, working with members of Korhan Futacı ve Kara Orkestra and Boğaziçi Jazz Choir.

Mori released her third album Finnari Kakaraska in March 2015, featuring two covers Gel by Ajda Pekkan and Kanatları Gümüş Yavru Bir Kuş by Nazım Hikmet.

She occasionally shares her works and announcements via her own Tumblr page since August 2009, as 2004 graduate of the Department of Graphic Design at Bilkent University.

As having relationship with fellow music producer Serhat Şensesli since 2017, she gave birth to her first child, Milan on July 10, 2020.

Discography

Studio albums
 Hayvanlar (2008)
 Deli Bando (2012)
 Finnari Kakaraska (2015)
 Estrella (2018)

Singles
 Dünya (2012)
 Muşta (Ç.A.K. live) (2013)
 Yine Buluşuruz (2016)
 Rampa Stampa (2020)
 Beni Bana Bırak (2020)
 Maviye (2021)
 Kırmızı Lavlar (2022)

Other works
Yasemin Mori features most of these works at her concerts, but she did not intend to release them on a new album, as she stated on MTV Turkey's talk show BeniMTV broadcast in October 2009, until she started working on development of Deli Bando in 2010.

 Bir Beyaz Balina (A white whale)
 Can Cambaz (Glass junglor)
 Dünya Her Gün Caz Yapar (The world makes jazz everyday)
 Hey Baksana (Hey let you look)
 Karamel (Caramel)
 Mutsuz Böcek (Sad bug)
 Uzay Kuşu (Space Bird)

References

  Official Tumblog

1982 births
Living people
Turkish women singers
Turkish singer-songwriters
Bilkent University alumni
Alternative rock singers
Shoegaze musicians
Turkish rock singers
People from Ankara
Musicians from Istanbul